Fernando Alberto Fica Ortega (born 21 April 1983) is a Chilean footballer who last played for Magallanes.

He played as central midfielder during his active years.

Honours

Club
Provincial Osorno
 Primera B (1): 2007

Deportes Iquique
 Copa Chile: 2010
 Primera B: 2010

External links
 
 
 Fernando Fica at Football-Lineups

1983 births
Living people
Chilean footballers
Colo-Colo footballers
Deportes Iquique footballers
Magallanes footballers
Provincial Osorno footballers
C.D. Antofagasta footballers
Chilean Primera División players
Primera B de Chile players
Association football midfielders